Sequel Youth and Family Services is a private for-profit operator of behavioral healthcare facilities for children and youth in the United States. The company is headquartered in Huntsville, Alabama and owns a nationwide network of over 40 facilities in more than 15 states, including residential treatment centers, group homes, special schools, and community-based programs.

History 
Sequel Youth and Family Services was formed out of Youth Services International (YSI), a for-profit juvenile corrections company. Adam Shapiro and John "Jay" Ripley, who both worked for YSI, co-founded Sequel Youth and Family Services in 1999 and currently serve as co-chairmen on company's board.

Sequel was initially founded to operate Clarinda Academy, a youth residential facility in Clarinda, Iowa. Sequel has expanded over the years by acquiring various youth facilities across the country, including some former YSI facilities.

In September 2009, Sequel Youth and Family Services acquired Three Springs Inc. (TSI), an operator of youth behavioral health facilities based in Huntsville, Alabama.

In September 2017, the private equity firm Altamont Capital acquired a majority stake in Sequel Youth and Family Services.

In September 2021, Ripley formed Vivant Behavioral Healthcare to "buy a majority of the business of Sequel Youth & Family Services."

Criticism and controversies

Abuse 
There have been a number of cases of abuse at Sequel facilities.

In mid 2019, the firm closed Mount Pleasant Academy and Red Rock Canyon School both in St. George, Utah after press reports of sexual abuse and a riot at the Red Rock Canyon facility. Ten members of staff at the Red Rock Canyon School had been charged with child abuse.

In 2019, the state of Oregon brought home all foster children it sent to out-of-state Sequel facilities. 
 
In April 2020, 16-year-old Cornelius Frederick was killed by staff at the now-closed Lakeside Academy in Kalamazoo. As a result of the death, the company lost its license to operate in the state and facility was closed.

In February 2021, the company announced it would close the Clarinda Academy in Iowa. The school, which operated under a contract with the Iowa Department of Human Services, faced charges of rape of children, beatings, and indefinite use of solitary confinement.

In March 2021, a staff member at the Falcon Ridge Academy in Virgin, Utah was arrested on charges of sexual battery. This school is designed to help girls suffering from the results of sexual trauma.

In July 2021, the state of California brought home all foster children it sent to out-of-state Sequel facilities.

Closed facilities 
As of 2021, the following Sequel-owned facilities have closed:
Auldern Academy, Siler City, North Carolina (2009 - 2021)
Bernalillo Academy, Albuquerque, New Mexico (2012 - 2021)
Clarinda Academy, Clarinda, Iowa (1999 - 2021)
Kingston Academy, Kingston, Tennessee (2009 - 2019)
Lakeside Academy, Kalamazoo, Michigan (2007 - 2020)
Lexington Academy, Lexington, Indiana (1996 - 2017)
Mount Pleasant Academy, Mount Pleasant, Utah (2016 - 2019)
Normative Services Academy, Sheridan, Wyoming (2003 - 2021)
Northern Illinois Academy, Aurora, Illinois (2021)
Red Rock Canyon School, St. George, Utah (2016 - 2019)
Riverside Academy, Wichita, Kansas (2011 - 2019)
Rose Rock Academy, Oklahoma City, Oklahoma (2011 - 2016)
Sequel Pomegranate Health Systems, Columbus, Ohio (2016 - 2021)
Sequel TSI Madison, Madison, Alabama (2009 - 2019)
Sequel TSI North Carolina, Pittsboro, North Carolina (2009 - 2010)
Sequel TSI of Kissimmee, Kissimmee, Florida (2009 - 2016)
Sequel TSI Paint Rock Valley, Trenton, Alabama (2009 - 2011)
Sequel TSI Sierra Vista, Hereford, Arizona (2009 - 2011)
Starr Albion Prep, Albion, Michigan (2014 - 2020)
Union Juvenile Residential Facility, Raiford, Florida (2009 - 2019)

Facilities

In 2021, Sequel  ran the following facilities:

 Sequel TSI of Courtland, Courtland, Alabama
 Sequel TSI of Montgomery, Montgomery, Alabama
 Sequel TSI of Owens Cross Roads, Owens Cross Roads, Alabama
 Sequel TSI of Tuskegee, Tuskegee, Alabama
 Casa Grande Academy, Casa Grande, Arizona
 Mingus Mountain Academy, Prescott Valley, Arizona
SequelCare of Arizona, Prescott, Arizona
 Alachua Academy, Gainesville, Florida
 Charles Britt Academy, St. Petersburg, Florida
 Columbus Youth Academy, Tampa, Florida
 Duval Academy, Jacksonville, Florida
 Marion Youth Academy, Ocala, Florida
 Palm Beach Youth Academy, West Palm Beach, Florida
 Pompano Youth Treatment Center, Pompano Beach, Florida
 St. John's Youth Academy, St. Augustine, Florida
SequelCare of Florida, Pinellas Park, Port Richey, Port St. Lucie, West Palm Beach, and Vero Beach, Florida
 Mountain Home Academy, Mountain Home, Idaho
 Forest Ridge Youth Services, Gruver, Iowa
 Woodward Academy, Woodward, Iowa
 Woodward Community Based Services, Urbandale, Iowa
North Shore Pediatric Therapy, Chicago, Deerfield, Des Plaines, Evanston, Glenview, Lake Bluff, Lincolnwood, and Naperville, Illinois
 Lakeside Academy, Goddard, Kansas
SequelCare of Maine, Bangor, Rockland, Searsport, and Yarmouth, Maine
 Sequel Alliance Family Services, Reno, Nevada
 Capital Academy, Camden, New Jersey
 Bernalillo Academy, Albuquerque, New Mexico
 Aaron School, New York, New York
 Rebecca School, New York, New York
SequelCare of Oklahoma, Antlers, Broken Bow, Durant, Hugo, Poteau, and Tulsa, Oklahoma
 Sequel Transition Academy, Sioux Falls, South Dakota
 Norris Academy, Andersonville, Tennessee
 Pine Cone Therapies, Keller, Missouri City, and Southlake, Texas
 Falcon Ridge Ranch, Virgin, Utah
 Lava Heights Academy, Tocqueville, Utah

References

External links
Sequel Youth and Family Services -- Official Site

Huntsville, Alabama
2006 establishments in Alabama